Antoni Przybylski (1913 — September 21, 1985), (Polish pronunciation ), sometimes referred to as "Bill", was a Polish-Australian astronomer best known for discovering Przybylski's Star.

Early life
In the 1930s, Przybylski attended the University of Poznan and worked as a research assistant at their observatory, where he studied comets.

World War II
At the outbreak of the Second World War, he joined the Polish Army and served as an artillery officer during the defense of Warsaw, after which he was taken prisoner and interned in Mecklenburg. In 1941, he escaped, and made his way across Germany, mostly at night, until he finally arrived in Switzerland, where he spent the rest of the war as a student and instructor at ETH Zurich. At ETH, he eventually earned a Doctorate in Technical Science, writing a thesis titled "Determination of Oxygen in Copper."

Australia
In 1950, Przybylski emigrated to Australia. There, he spent five months as a manual laborer before coming to the attention of Richard Woolley, who recruited him to work at Mount Stromlo Observatory (part of the then-nascent Australian National University). Woolley subsequently awarded him a scholarship, and then became his thesis supervisor; in 1954, Przybylski received the first doctorate bestowed by ANU, for his thesis on the theory of stellar atmospheres.

In 1957, Woolley was replaced as director of Mount Stromlo by Bart Bok, who mandated that the observatory's theoreticians also participate in direct observation; this led directly to Przybylski's discovery that HD101065 is a peculiar star. Przybylski also was the first to attempt a fine analysis of a high dispersion spectrum of a star in the Magellanic Clouds.

Later life

After retiring from Mount Stromlo, Przybylski lived at ANU's John XXIII college and studied botany, zoology, and geology gaining a Bachelor of Science degree in Natural Sciences in 1984 at the age of 71, a year before his death.

References

External links
Grave of Antoni Przybylski at BillionGraves.com

1913 births
1985 deaths
20th-century Australian astronomers
20th-century Polish astronomers
Adam Mickiewicz University in Poznań alumni
Australian National University alumni
ETH Zurich alumni
Polish emigrants to Australia
People from Oborniki County